The following is a list of soul jazz musicians.

A
Cannonball Adderley – sax
Nat Adderley – cornet
Allen & Allen
Gene Ammons – sax
Curtis Amy – sax
Roy Ayers – vibraphone

B
Gary Bartz – sax
Joe Beck – guitar
George Benson – guitar, vocals
Lou Blackburn – trombone
Earl Bostic – sax
George Braith – sax
Zachary Breaux – guitar
Bobby Broom – guitar
Norman Brown
Ray Bryant – piano
Rusty Bryant
Kenny Burrell – guitar
Billy Butler
Donald Byrd – trumpet

C
Terry Callier
Ray Charles
Arnett Cobb – sax
Sonny Cox – sax
Hank Crawford – sax
The Crusaders
King Curtis - sax

D
Eddie "Lockjaw" Davis – sax
Wild Bill Davis
Joey DeFrancesco – organ, trumpet
Bill Doggett
Lou Donaldson – sax
George Duke – keys
Cornell Dupree – guitar

E
Charles Earland

F
Wilton Felder
Ronnie Foster
George Freeman
Funk, Inc.
Maynard Ferguson – trumpet

G
Grant Green – guitar

H
Herbie Hancock – piano
Eddie Harris
Gene Harris
Bill Heid
Wayne Henderson
Red Holloway – saxophone
Ron Holloway – tenor saxophone
Richard Holmes – organ
Stix Hooper
Freddie Hubbard – trumpet
Bobbi Humphrey – flute

J
Fred Jackson – sax
Willis Jackson – sax
The J.B.'s
Henry Johnson
Plas Johnson
Wayne Johnson – guitar
Boogaloo Joe Jones – guitar
Ronny Jordan – guitar

K
Rahsaan Roland Kirk
Earl Klugh – guitar
Charles Kynard

L
Delvon Lamarr Organ Trio
Ramsey Lewis – piano
Bobby Lyle – piano
Johnny Lytle

M
Harold Mabern – piano
Junior Mance – piano
Herbie Mann – sax, flute
Hank Marr – organ
Pat Martino – guitar
Hugh Masekela – trumpet
Les McCann – piano
Jack McDuff – organ
Jimmy McGriff – organ
Big Jay McNeely – sax
Charles Mingus
Jackie Mittoo – organ
Hank Mobley – sax
Wes Montgomery – guitar
Wild Bill Moore – sax
Lee Morgan – trumpet
Dick Morrissey – tenor/soprano sax
Idris Muhammad – drums
Ronald Muldrow – guitar

N
Oliver Nelson – sax
David "Fathead" Newman – sax

O
Johnny O'Neal

P
Maceo Parker – sax
John Patton – organ
Duke Pearson – piano
Houston Person – sax
Sonny Phillips
Trudy Pitts
Jimmy Ponder
Seldon Powell – sax, flute
Pucho & His Latin Soul Brothers
Bernard Purdie

Q
Ike Quebec – sax

R
Chuck Rainey
Joshua Redman – sax
Freddie Roach

S
Joe Sample – piano
David Sanborn
Marlon Saunders – vocals
Rhoda Scott – organ
Shirley Scott – organ
Horace Silver – piano
Nina Simone – vocals
Dr. Lonnie Smith – organ
Jimmy Smith – organ
Johnny "Hammond" Smith – organ
Tab Smith – sax
Melvin Sparks – guitar
Leon Spencer – organ
Sonny Stitt – sax
Soulive

T
Grady Tate – drums
Billy Taylor – piano
The Three Sounds
Bobby Timmons – piano
Stanley Turrentine – sax

U
James Ulmer

V
Harold Vick – sax, flute

W
Jr. Walker & the All Stars
Winston Walls
Grover Washington, Jr. – sax
Mark Whitfield – guitar
Don Wilkerson
Baby Face Willette – organ
Jack Wilson – piano
Reuben Wilson

Y
Larry Young (jazz) – organ
Young-Holt Unlimited

Z
Joe Zawinul – keyboards

References 

 
Soul-jazz